Downfall may refer to:

Books
 The Downfall (novel), an 1892 book by Émile Zola
 Downfall: The End of the Imperial Japanese Empire, a 1999 book by Richard B. Frank about the last days of World War II
 Downfall, a 2001 Dragonlance novel by Jean Rabe
 Downfall, a 2007 novel in the LEGO Bionicle Legends series
 Downfall (book), a 2011 book about the political career of Tommy Sheridan

Film and television 
 Downfall (1923 film), a 1923 German silent film
 The Downfall (film), a 1961 Greek film
 Downfall (1997 film), a 1997 Korean film starring Shin Eun-gyeong
 Downfall (2004 film), a 2004 German film about the last days of Nazi Germany
 "Downfall" (RahXephon episode)
 Downfall (game show), an American game show, hosted by Chris Jericho
 Downfall: The Case Against Boeing, a 2022 documentary film about two fatal crashes of the Boeing 737 MAX and the subsequent investigations
 Dead Space: Downfall, a 2008 animated science fiction film

Music 
 Downfall (band), a Californian punk rock band

Albums
 Downfall (Solitude Aeturnus album), 1996 
 Downfall (The Gathering album), 2001
 "Downfall", a 2015 EP by From Ashes to New
 My Downfall (Original Soundtrack), a 2007 album by breakcore artist Venetian Snares

Songs
 "Downfall" (Children of Bodom song), 1998
 "Downfall" (Matchbox Twenty song), 2004
 "Downfall" (Trust Company song), 2002
 "Downfall", a single by Architects from their 2016 album All Our Gods Have Abandoned Us
 "The Downfall", a song by Gardenian from their 1997 album Two Feet Stand
 "Downfall", a song by Lacuna Coil from their 2016 album Delirium

Other 
 Downfall (game), a two-player strategy game from Milton Bradley Company
 The Downfall (mountain), a mountain in Antarctica
 Operation Downfall, the Allied plan for the invasion of Japan at the end of World War II

See also